Government Medical College, Srinagar, Pauri Garhwal or Veer Chandra Singh Garhwali Government Medical Science and Research Institute or VCSGGMSRI is a government medical college located near Srinagar, Uttarakhand, in Pauri Garhwal district, Uttarakhand, India. The institute was established in 2008. The college is located midst the beautiful himalayan mountainous ranges. This college is equipped with advanced medical equipment and cutting-edge medical technology which has proved to be a boon for the local population. The college admits 125 (from 2019) M.B.B.S. students annually through a highly competitive competition.
This college also signifies indomitable will of Government of India and Government of Uttarakhand to provide tertiary healthcare for every citizen of the state.

Connectivity
The college is well connected via road to the capital of Uttarakhand, Dehradun. College is at a distance of about 126 km from the nearby airport (Jolly Grant Airport, Dehradun). Construction of a rail line joining Srinagar garhwal to Rishikesh is ongoing.

Infrastructure
College is well equipped with modern infrastructure. There are 5 lecture theatres, each having a capacity of 140 students and equipped with modern audio visual aids and AC. It also has a fully computerized library with wi-fi connectivity. Hostels are good with necessary facilities including mess. All departments have adequate space and modern laboratories. A modern auditorium was also inaugurated in 2020. The entire campus is under CCTV surveillance.

Associated hospital
HNB Base Hospital is the associated hospital of the college. It is a 500-bed hospital with all modern facilities.

Campus
College has a well maintained campus, judicious use of solar energy for its electrification being a marked feature. The campus is surrounded by lush green vegetation.

Admission procedure
85% of total seats are filled by state quota, and the rest (15%) by all-India quota. Entrance exam for admission under state quota is NEET-UG

Academics
Four batches have passed out from the college as of 2016.

Courses
The institute offers M.B.B.S. and M.D. and post MBBS DNB Diploma courses in various specialties including Pediatrics, Anesthesia, Obstetrics and Gynecology, ENT, Ophthalmology, Community Medicine, Pathology, Microbiology, Forensic Medicine, Biochemistry, Physiology and Anatomy.

References

Medical colleges in Uttarakhand
Pauri Garhwal district
2008 establishments in Uttarakhand
Educational institutions established in 2008